Parandak (formerly, Rahimabad, also Romanized as Raḩīmābād) is a city in the Central District of Zarandieh County, Markazi Province, Iran. It is located about 65 km southwest of Capital of Iran (Tehran).The salt river passes near the north of the city.

Parnadak have first industrial in Markazi province.

Language 
The people of this city speak Persian and Turkish.

Representative of Velayat-e Faqih 
Hojatoleslam and Muslims Sayyid Hassan Muhammadi Imam Jomeh Parandak City.

References 

Cities in Markazi Province
Populated places in Zarandieh County